Paolo di Campofregoso (1427 –  22 March 1498) was an Italian Catholic archbishop who was three times doge of Genoa.

Biography

The son of doge Battista Fregoso, he was convinced by Pope Nicholas V to study ecclesiastical matters at Pavia. In 1448, once finished with his studies, he was appointed canon of the cathedral of Savona, and in 1453 he became abbot of the Cistercian convent of Sant'Andrea at Savona. The same year, aged only 26, he was appointed archbishop of Genoa by request of his brother Pietro, the current doge. Pietro had become doge for the first time in 1450, succeeding his cousin Lodovico, who had resigned for unknown reasons. His rule ended in 1458 when the city surrendered itself to King Charles VII of France.

Further strife with his cousin caused Lodovico to cede the title of doge to Paolo on 14 May 1462. His rule ended after just fifteen days, as he was replaced by five captains. The latter, in turn, lasted for only a week, after which Lodovico di Campofregoso was restored as doge: now the hate between Paolo, the city's archbishop, and Lodovico, the city's political chief, reached its apex. Paolo succeeded him as doge in January 1463 and had Lodovico detained in the castle of Castelletto. The following year, after a series of questionable deeds (such as menacing the expulsion of the Adorno family from Genoa, and the endless strife within the Fregoso family), the Council of the Elders deposed him, accepting the protection of the House of Sforza, which lasted until 1477.

Life as cardinal 
In 1480 he was created cardinal in Rome. In that year he participated as papal admiral for an expedition alongside the Neapolitan fleet of Ferdinand I against the Turks at Otranto. In 1483 Paolo di Campofregoso was elected as doge of Genoa for the third time; however, this time a popular rebellion forced him to flee his city in 1488, being succeeded by another submission to the Sforzas. He subsequently lived in exile in Piedmont, Veneto and Rome. In 1490 he received the cardinal title of San Sisto, and took part in the conclave of 1492.

Later years 
In 1495 he resigned from archbishopric of Genoa, but the following year he was appointed to that post again. In his late life he participated in the struggle to expel Charles VIII of France from Genoa.

See also 

 Republic of Genoa
 Doge of Genoa
 Genoa

References

External links
 retrieved 3 May 2008
Campofregoso Dogi; Paolo (Italian) retrieved 3 May 2008

1427 births
1498 deaths
15th-century Doges of Genoa
Roman Catholic archbishops of Genoa
15th-century Italian cardinals
Paolo
Bishops of Ajaccio
15th-century Italian Roman Catholic archbishops